de Paula is a surname.

List of people with the surname 

 André de Paula (born 1961), Brazilian politician
 Bruna de Paula (born 1996), Brazilian handball player
 Darly de Paula (born 1982), Brazilian-born Spanish handball goalkeeper
 Emanuela de Paula (born 1989), Brazilian model
 Francisco de Paula del Villar y Lozano (1828–1901), Spanish architect
 Francisco de Paula Santander (1792–1840), Colombian military and political leader
 Giuliano de Paula (born 1990), Brazilian professional footballer
 Gloria de Paula (born 1995), Brazilian mixed martial artist
 Guilherme de Paula (born 1986), Brazilian professional footballer
 José de Paula (born 1990), Dominican professional baseball pitcher
 Óscar de Paula (born 1975), Spanish retired footballer
 Patrick de Paula (born 1999), Brazilian professional footballer
 Tjoe de Paula (born 1982), Dutch-Dominican retired basketball player
 Tilde de Paula Eby (born 1972), Chilean-born Swedish journalist, author and television presenter

See also 
 De Paul (surname)
 Francisco de Paula (disambiguation)

Surnames
Surnames of Portuguese origin